Tony Van Bynen  (born April 5, 1950) is a Canadian politician, who was elected to the Canadian House of Commons in the 2019 Canadian federal election. He represents the district of Newmarket—Aurora as a member of the Liberal Party of Canada, and previously served as mayor of Newmarket, Ontario from 2006 to 2018.

Background

Born in the Netherlands, Van Bynen immigrated to Canada in 1952 with his parents, and grew up on a family farm with five brothers and five sisters near London, Ontario.  He eventually moved to Newmarket in 1980 after relocating to work as a bank branch manager.

Municipal politics

He entered municipal politics in 2000 when he was elected as a town councillor, then was elected as a regional councillor in 2003 and subsequently as mayor in 2006, defeating his opponent Diane Springstein by 800 votes, a 4.6% margin. He was re-elected in the 2010 election, defeating his only challenger, Michael Cascione. He was again re-elected in 2014.

Van Bynen did not stand for re-election in the 2018 municipal election.

Federal politics

In 2019, Van Bynen became the Liberal Party candidate for the riding of Newmarket—Aurora in the federal election of the same year. He was subsequently elected over former Conservative MP Lois Brown.

Community involvement 
Van Bynen has volunteered at Southlake Hospital and the homeless shelter Inn From The Cold for over a decade with his wife, Roxanne. He also helped to create Belinda's Place, a facility that provides support for homeless and at-risk women in Newmarket.

In 2013, Van Bynen received the Queen Elizabeth II Diamond Jubilee Medal in recognition of his community service and leadership.

Honours 
Queen Elizabeth II Diamond Jubilee Medal

Electoral record

Federal

References

External links

Tony Van Bynen

Mayors of Newmarket, Ontario
Dutch emigrants to Canada
Living people
Liberal Party of Canada MPs
Members of the House of Commons of Canada from Ontario
21st-century Canadian politicians
1950 births